Anderson Park is a public park in the city of Redmond, Washington. The site was acquired in 1928 as Redmond City Park before being expanded and improved through the economic response of the Federal Works Progress Administration in 1938. The park was given its present name in 1946, and is listed on the National Register of Historic Places.

The official name of the park is Albert Anderson Memorial Park; it is still sometimes referred to by the original name of Redmond City Park. Albert Anderson was key to the modern redevelopment of the park through his community work regarding park projects and volunteer coordination.  Two cabins are within the park; they were formerly used for public events and services, hosted the Redmond Senior Center, and housed various other city administrative offices prior to the development of city hall.

See also 
National Register of Historic Places listings in King County, Washington

References

1938 establishments in Washington (state)
Historic districts on the National Register of Historic Places in Washington (state)
National Register of Historic Places in King County, Washington
Parks in Redmond, Washington
Parks on the National Register of Historic Places in Washington (state)
Protected areas established in 1938
National Park Service rustic in Washington (state)